Volutidae, common name volutes, are a taxonomic family of predatory sea snails that range in size from 9 mm to over 500 mm. They are marine gastropod mollusks. Most of the species have no operculum.

Distribution
This family of sea snails are found mainly in tropical seas, though some species also inhabit the waters of the polar circles.

Shell description
The shell of species such as Melo amphora can grow as large as 50 cm (19.7 inches) in length.

Volutes are distinguished by their distinctively marked spiral shells (to which the family name refers, voluta meaning "scroll" in Latin). 

The shells have an elongated aperture in their first whorl and an inner lip characterised by a number of deep plaits. The elaborate decorations of the shells has made them a popular collectors' item, with the imperial volute (Voluta imperialis) of the Philippines being particularly prized.

Taxonomy

Subfamilies and tribes
According to Bail & Poppe (2001) Volutidae can be subdivided into the following Subfamilies and tribes:
Amoriinae  Gray, 1857  
Tribe Meloini  Pilsbry & Olsson, 1954 
Tribe Amoriini Gray, 1857  
Athletinae  Pilsbry & Olsson, 1954 
Calliotectinae  Pilsbry & Olsson, 1954 
Cymbiinae H. Adams & A. Adams, 1853 
Tribe Adelomelonini  Pilsbry & Olsson, 1954 
Tribe Alcithoini  Pilsbry & Olsson, 1954 
Tribe Cymbiini  H. Adams & A. Adams, 1853 
Tribe Livoniini   Bail & Poppe, 2001
Tribe Odontocymbiolini  Clench & Turner, 1964 
Tribe Zidonini  H. Adams & A. Adams, 1853 
Fulgorariinae  Pilsbry & Olsson, 1954 
Plicolivinae  Bpichet, 1990 
Scaphellinae  Gray,  1857
Volutinae   
Tribe  Lyriini Pilsbry & Olsson, 1954  
Tribe Volutini  Rafinesque, 1815

Genera 
Genera within the Volutidae include:
 Adelomelon Dall, 1906 
 Alcithoe H. Adams & A. Adams, 1853 
 Amoria Gray, 1855
 Ampulla Röding, 1798
 Arctomelon Dall, 1915  
 Athleta Conrad, 1853
 Callipara Gray, 1847
 Calliotectum Dall, 1890
 Cymbiola Swainson, 1831
 Cymbiolacca 
 Cymbium Röding, 1798
Cymbium cymbium
Cymbium glans
Cymbium marmoratum
Cymbium olla (Linnaeus, 1758)
Cymbium pepo
 Enaeta H. Adams and A. Adams, 1853
 Ericusa H. Adams and A. Adams, 1858
 Festilyria Pilsbry & Olsson, 1954 
 Fulgoraria Schumacher, 1817
 Fusivoluta E. von Martens, 1902

 Harpovoluta Thiele, 1912
 Harpulina Dall, 1906
 Iredalina Finlay, 1926
 Leptoscapha Fischer, 1883
 Livonia Gray, 1855
 Lyria Gray, 1847
 † Mauira Marwick, 1943
 † Mauithoe Finlay, 1930  
 Melo Broderip in Sowerby I, 1826

  † Metamelon Marwick, 1926 
 Minicymbiola Klappenbach, 1979
 Miomelon Dall, 1907
 † Mitreola Swainson, 1833 
 Nannamoria Iredale, 1929
 Nanomelon Leal & Bouchet, 1989
 Neptuneopsis Sowerby III, 1898
 Notopeplum Finlay, 1927
 Notavoluta Cotton, 1946
 Odontocymbiola Clench & Turner, 1964
 † Pachymelon Marwick, 1926 
 Paramoria McMichael, 1960
 Plicoliva Petuch, 1979
 Provocator Watson, 1882     
 Scaphella Swainson, 1832
 Spinomelon Marwick, 1926     
 Tenebrincola Harasewych & Kantor, 1991
 Teramachia
 Tractolira Dall, 1890
 Voluta Linnaeus, 1758
 Volutifusus Conrad, 1863
 Volutoconus Crosse, 1871
 Waihaoia Marwick, 1926 
 Zygomelon Harasewych & Marshall, 1995 
 Zidona H. Adams and A. Adams, 1853

References

 ITIS
 "Volute." Encyclopædia Britannica, 2006.
 Powell A W B, New Zealand Mollusca, William Collins Publishers Ltd, Auckland, New Zealand 1979 
 Merle & Pacaud & Marivaux, 2014 <ref> Merle & Pacaud & Marivaux,  Volutidae (Mollusca: Gastropoda) of the Lakhra Formation (Earliest Eocene, Sindh, Pakistan): systematics, biostratigraphy and paleobiogeography; Zootaxa, 3826 (1) : 101-138, fig. 1-12. , 2014

External links
 Biodiversity Library: Maxwell Smith, A review of the Volutidae, Beal-Maltbie Shell Museum, Florida, 1942
 Miocene Gastropods and Biostratigraphy of the Kern River Area, California; United States Geological Survey Professional Paper 642 

 
Taxa named by Constantine Samuel Rafinesque
Gastropod families

Volutoidea